Obelisk is an unincorporated community in Upper Frederick Township and Lower Frederick Township in Montgomery County, Pennsylvania, United States. Obelisk is located at the intersection of Pennsylvania Route 73 and Faust Road.

Etymology

According to tradition, the community was so named from image of an obelisk in the logo of paper collars sold in the area.

References

Unincorporated communities in Montgomery County, Pennsylvania
Unincorporated communities in Pennsylvania